Guildford is a constituency in Surrey represented in the House of Commons of the UK Parliament since 2019 by Angela Richardson, a Conservative.

Constituency profile
The seat covers Guildford itself and a more rural area within the Surrey Hills AONB. The seat voted Remain in the 2016 EU referendum, and has wealthier and healthier residents than the national average.

History
From the first Commons in the Model Parliament of 1295 Guildford was a parliamentary borough sending two members to Parliament until 1868 and one until 1885.  In the latter years of sending two members a bloc vote system of elections was used.  Until 1885 the electorate in the town of Guildford elected the member(s) of parliament, which expanded in 1885 into a county division under the Redistribution of Seats Act 1885.

Early political history
The seat elected between 1868 and 2001 Conservatives.  Exceptions in this period took place when the two-then-three main British parties' policies were beginning to coalesce.  The first was a continuation of the centuries-old representation of Guildford by influential members of the Earl of Onslow's family, including a single member winning three widely spaced elections, before being defeated by a further member of the same family in its minor Sussex and British Indian branch, then the majority of the seat's voters were again swayed toward the Liberal landslide of the 1906 general election.

Modern political history
Successive elections in 2001 and 2005 saw marginal majorities of under 2% of the vote - in favour of a Liberal Democrat and then a Conservative.  The 2015 result brought the incumbent MP a Conservative majority of more than 41%, up from 14% in 2010.

Boundaries 

1885–1918: The Boroughs of Guildford and Godalming, the Sessional Division of Farnham, and part of the Sessional Division of Guildford.

1918–1950: The Boroughs of Guildford and Godalming, the Urban District of Haslemere, the Rural District of Hambledon, and the Rural District of Guildford except the civil parish of Pirbright.

1950–1983: The Borough of Guildford, in the Rural District of Guildford the parishes of Artington, Compton, Puttenham, Shackleford, Shalford, Wanborough, and Worplesdon, and in the Rural District of Hambledon the parishes of Alfold, Bramley, Busbridge, Cranleigh, Dunsfold, Ewhurst, Hambledon, Hascombe, and Wonersh.

1983–1997: The Borough of Guildford wards of Christchurch, Friary and St Nicolas, Holy Trinity, Merrow and Burpham, Onslow, Pilgrims, Shalford, Stoke, Stoughton, Tongham, Westborough, and Worplesdon, and the District of Waverley wards of Blackheath and Wonersh, Bramley, Cranleigh East, Cranleigh West, Ewhurst, and Shamley Green.

1997–2010: As above less Tongham ward.

2010–present: The Borough of Guildford wards of Burpham, Christchurch, Friary and St Nicolas, Holy Trinity, Merrow, Onslow, Pilgrims, Shalford, Stoke, Stoughton, Westborough, and Worplesdon, and the Borough of Waverley wards of Alfold, Blackheath and Wonersh, Cranleigh East, Cranleigh Rural and Ellens Green, Cranleigh West, Ewhurst, and Shamley Green and Cranleigh North.

The seat, at greatest limits from 1885 to 1918, still comprises Guildford and nearby parts of Surrey.

Members of Parliament

MPs 1295–1640

MPs 1640–1868 
prior to 1868 the constituency was jointly represented by two MPs

MPs since 1868

Elections

Elections in the 2010s

Elections in the 2000s

Elections in the 1990s

This constituency underwent boundary changes between the 1992 and 1997 general elections and thus change in share of vote is based on a notional calculation.

Elections in the 1980s

Elections in the 1970s

Elections in the 1960s

Elections in the 1950s

Boundaries were redrawn in time for the 1950 general election. From 1918 to 1950 the three parts of western Surrey are set out at the 1918 results below.  The next change saw an additional seat duty carved out, to be Woking.  As a result, Guildford, now oversized, shrank considerably in area and population.  To the south the areas of Godalming, Elstead, Thursley, Whitley, Haslemere and Chiddingford were added to the Farnham seat.  To the east Send, Ripley, Wisley, Ockham, St Martha, Albury, Shere, Clandon and Horsley were added to Dorking.

These boundaries centred on the town of Guildford plus an area southwards towards Cranleigh, became, with small changes in later reviews, form the basic shape for Guildford until present.

Elections in the 1940s

Elections in the 1930s

Elections in the 1920s

Elections in the 1910s

From 1885 to 1918 the west part of Surrey had been represented by two seats - in the north the seat of Chertsey, in the south that of Guildford. Boundaries were redrawn for proper apportionment in time for the 1918 general election such that the same area saw three seats - Farnham in the west, Chertsey in the north east and Guildford in the south east.

As a result, the seat lost the areas of Ash, Normandy, Seale, Frensham and Farnham, towards its west, but to the east gained the areas of Merrow, Send, Ripley, Ockham, Wisley, Clandon and Horsley from Chertsey.

Elections in the 1900s

Elections in the 1890s

Elections in the 1880s

Constituency boundaries were redrawn in time for the 1885 general election.  From 1868 to 1885 the west part of Surrey had been represented by two constituencies, one known as Guildford (which consisted of the town centre of Guildford and little else) and one constituency known as Surrey Western, which comprised the rest of that part of the county of Surrey. The Guildford constituency was both geographically and in size of electorate significantly smaller than the Surrey Western constituency.  The 1885 to 1918 constituency boundaries saw the area of west Surrey divided into two constituencies more equal in size of population and land area.  The north part of west Surrey was given the constituency name Chertsey, the south part Guildford.

Elections in the 1870s

Elections in the 1860s

Constituency boundaries were redrawn in time for the 1868 election.

Prior to the 1868 general election, the constituency of Guildford was represented by two Members of Parliament.  That was reduced to one from 1868 onwards.

The 1868 to 1885 constituency known as Guildford was geographically limited to an area around the current centre of Guildford town.  This is in marked contrast to the various post-1885 versions of the constituency known as Guildford all of which have had a much greater geographical area.  The 1868 constituency was, at its maximum, little over one mile east to west, and just over one mile north to south. (Most of the area which is in the modern constituency of Guildford would in 1868 have been part of the Surrey Western Constituency, rather than the Guildford Constituency.)

The 17 December 1866 by-election was caused by Bovill resigning as an MP following his appointment to judicial office, namely Chief Justice of the Court of Common Pleas.

The 11 July 1866 by-election resulted from the need of Bovill to seek re-election upon his appointment as Solicitor General for England and Wales. Long withdrew from the contest before polling.

Elections in the 1850s
Party designations for many candidates during the 1830s, 1840s and 1850s can be problematic as party ties were not as strong as those that developed, in Britain, in the late 19th century.  Therefore, for the 1830s to 1850s election results, listed below, the term Liberal includes Whigs and Radicals; and the term Conservative includes Tories and Peelites, unless otherwise specified.

The 22 October 1858 by-election was caused by RD Mangles resigning as an MP following his appointment as Member of the Council of India.

Elections in the 1840s

Elections in the 1830s

Constituency boundaries were redrawn in time for the 1832 general election.

See also
List of parliamentary constituencies in Surrey

Notes

References

Sources
Election result, 2015 (BBC)
Election result, 2010 (BBC)
Election result, 2005 (BBC)
Election results, 1997 - 2001 (BBC)
Election results, 1997 - 2001  (Election Demon)
Election results, 1983 - 1992 (Election Demon)
Election results, 1945 - 1979 (Political Resources)

Parliamentary constituencies in South East England
Constituencies of the Parliament of the United Kingdom established in 1295
Politics of Guildford
Guildford